Journey to the Rock is an adventure module written by Michael Malone and published by TSR, Inc. in 1985, for the Basic Rules of the Dungeons & Dragons fantasy role-playing game. It is intended for player characters of level 1-3.

Summary
Journey to the Rock is a wilderness scenario, which includes rules for adventuring in the wilderness. The wizard Lirdrium Arkayz wants to know the secret of 'The Rock' and hires the characters to uncover it. The player characters must travel through a hazardous countryside by choosing one of three possible routes to get to the Rock.

Publication history
Journey to the Rock was written by Michael Malone, with a cover by Larry Elmore, and was published by TSR in 1985 as a 32-page booklet with an outer folder.

Reception
Wendy J. Rose reviewed the module in Imagine magazine, giving it a positive review. She felt that the plot was sound if unoriginal and that the module was noteworthy as, unusually, almost all the action takes place outdoors. According to Rose there are plenty of good opportunities for roleplaying, it is not just "hack-and-slay" and the module contains several interesting new monsters. However, she also criticized a number of things: the quality of production is "rough in places", space is wasted by repetition of rules, and the English is "stilted". The gamemaster has to be very familiar with the module, according to Rose, but she noted that it compares favorably with the others of the B series and is a "good buy".

See also
 List of Dungeons & Dragons modules

Reviews
The V.I.P. of Gaming Magazine #2 (1986)
http://www.rpg.net/news+reviews/reviews/rev_4121.html

In popular culture
This module was lampooned by the website Something Awful on July 22, 2010.

References and Footnotes

External links

Dungeons & Dragons modules
Mystara
Role-playing game supplements introduced in 1985